Mesopotamia was the name of a Byzantine theme (a military-civilian province) located in what is today eastern Turkey. It should not be confused with the region of Mesopotamia or with the older Roman and early Byzantine province of Mesopotamia. The Byzantine theme was located between the rivers Arsanias (modern Murat) and Çimisgezek.

History

The theme was formed probably between 899 and 911, when Emperor Basil II  (r. 886–912) appointed the former proconsul of the Province of Pontus, named Lucius, as its governor. Most of the province was formed out the Georgian principality of Taron, ruled by the chieftain Manuel Bagratiom. Manuel and his four sons were persuaded to cede their territory to the Byzantine Empire in exchange for titles and estates in other themes. The Armenian-populated districts of Keltzene (detached from the theme of Chaldia) and Kamacha (part of the theme of Koloneia) were then joined to it to form the new theme.

Although Emperor Constantine VII Porphyrogennetos (r. 913–959) mentions that before its elevation to a theme, the region was an "unnamed kleisoura", there is evidence of much earlier administrative structures than that. A seal of a "spatharios and strategos of Mesopotamia" has been dated to c. 810, perhaps indicating the existence of a first short-lived theme there, and a seal of a tourmarches with the Armenian name Mousilikes, is tentatively dated to c. 870.

It is thus possible that Mesopotamia was constituted in the late 9th century out of an Armenian principality as a division (tourma) of some neighbouring theme, with its prince receiving a Byzantine title and continuing to govern it, before it was expanded into a full theme.

Commanders of the theme continued to be appointed throughout the 10th century, co-existing with the new post of "doux of Mesopotamia", established c. 975. Unlike the strategos, the doux was a regional commander, controlling the central sector of Byzantium's eastern frontier. In the 11th century, most of the attested  of Mesopotamia were Armenians, including Gregory Magistros and his son. In the aftermath of the Battle of Manzikert in 1071, Emperor Michael VII Doukas (r. 1071–1078) tried to re-establish Byzantine authority, but the province fell to the Seljuk Turks.

References

Sources

Byzantine Anatolia
Themes of the Byzantine Empire
States and territories established in the 9th century